Bāṭin or baten literally means "inner", "inward", "hidden", etc. The Quran, for instance, has a hidden meaning in contrast to its exterior or apparent meaning, the zahir (zaher). Sufis believe that every individual has a batin in the world of souls. It is the inward self of the individual; when cleansed with the light of one's spiritual guide, it elevates a person spiritually. 
This notion is connected to Allah's attribute of the Hidden One, who cannot be seen but exists in every realm.

Many Ismaili Muslim thinkers have stressed the importance of the balance between the exoteric (zahir) and the esoteric (batin) in the understanding of faith, and have explained that spiritual interpretation (ta’wil) entails elucidating the esoteric meaning (bātin) from the exoteric form (zahir).

Muslim groups believe that batin can be fully understood only by a figure with esoteric knowledge. For Shia Muslims, that is the Imam of Time.

In a wider sense, batin is the inner meaning or reality behind all existence, the zahir being the world of form and the apparent meaning.

A grounding feature of Ismailism is the co-existence of the physical and the spiritual, the zahir (exoteric) form and the batin (esoteric) essence. The esoteric is the source of the exoteric, and the exoteric is the manifestation of the esoteric. This concept is highlighted in the “Epistle of the Right Path”, a Persian Ismaili prose text from the post-Mongol period of Ismaili history, by an anonymous author.

See also
 Sufism
 Esotericism
 Esoteric interpretation of the Quran
 Batiniyya
 Ismailism
 Nizari
 Alawites
 Qarmatians

References

External links 
 Sufi Live

Ismaili theology
Quranic exegesis
Shia Islam
Islamic terminology